is a Japanese voice actor who appeared in 35 films since he first started acting in 1990 and is best known for doing the voice of Jin Kazama from the Tekken series.

Biography
Isshin Chiba was born in Kesennuma, Miyagi, Japan. He graduated from Miyagi Prefecture Kesennuma High School. After graduating from high school, he had the idea to become a stage actor. However, because he had no experience in such extracurricular activities in particular, he attended Katsuma Voice Actor's Academy in Tokyo. He started his career as a voice actor at age 22 in 1990. In 1997, he landed the role for which he is best known, the role of Jin Kazama from the Tekken fighting game series. Starting from Tekken 3, he voiced Jin in all other Tekken games, including crossovers Namco × Capcom, Street Fighter X Tekken, Project X Zone, Project X Zone 2, The King of Fighters All Star  and adaptations Tekken: Blood Vengeance and the Japanese dub of the live-action Tekken film. This makes Isshin Chiba the sixth single actor playing a videogame character the longest, behind Ed Boon, who voices Scorpion from Mortal Kombat, Takenobu Mitsuyoshi who voices Kage Maru from Virtua Fighter, Shin-ichiro Miki who voices Akira Yuki from Virtua Fighter, Joseph D. Kucan, who voices Kane from Command & Conquer and Charles Martinet who voices Mario.

Filmography

Television animation

Movies
Big Wars (1993) – Operator
Detective Conan: Captured In Her Eyes (2000) – Detective Chiba
Doraemon: Nobita and the Winged Braves (2001) – Crow Guard
Detective Conan: Countdown to Heaven (2001) – Detective Chiba
Rockman EXE Hikari to Yami no Program (2005) – Barrel
Detective Conan: The Private Eyes' Requiem (2006) – Officer Chiba
Tekken: Blood Vengeance (2011) – Jin Kazama
Lupin the 3rd vs. Detective Conan: The Movie (2013) – Detective Chiba
Thunderbolt Fantasy: The Sword Of Life And Death (2017) – Tie Di Xian
The Legend of the Galactic Heroes: Die Neue These Seiran (2019) – Arthur von Streit

ONA
7 Seeds (2019) – Norikazu Kagami
Tekken: Bloodline (2022) – Jin Kazama

OVA
Please Save My Earth (1993) – Takashi Matsudaira
Fencer of Minerva (1994) – Harif
Detective Conan: Conan and Heiji and the Vanished Boy (2003) – Yousuke Moriguchi

Video games

Drama CD
Jigoku Meguri 1: Jyou – Hideo Kirishima/Fugitive (1988)
Saint Seiya – Sagittarius Aiolos (1997)
Deep Fear – Mookie Carver (1998)
Analyst no Yuutsu series 1: Benchmark ni Koi wo Shite – Yasunari Nogi (2002)
Hisoyaka na Jounetsu Series side story 2: Iro Koi – Kouichi Takeshima (2003)
Mossore (2003)
Synapse no Hitsugi – Kaidou (2007)
Ai nante Kueru ka yo (2008)
Koi Himeyamo – Ootake (2010)
Chikatetsu no Inu – Shinoda (2011)
S.O.S -secret ocean story- (Ep 3) – Lawrence (2016)

Tokusatsu
Ultraman Neos (2000) – Ultraseven 21 (eps. 2, 4, 6, 10 - 12)
Kamen Rider Decade (2009) – Garulu (ep. 4 - 5)
Tensou Sentai Goseiger (2010) – Matroid Zuteru-S of the Mach (ep. 35)
Kamen Rider × Kamen Rider Fourze & OOO: Movie War Mega Max (2011) – Kamen Rider X
Kaitou Sentai Lupinranger VS Keisatsu Sentai Patranger (2018) – Zarudan Hou (ep. 20)

Dubbing

References

External links

Isshin Chiba's ARTSVISION page

1968 births
Living people
Male voice actors from Miyagi Prefecture
Japanese Christians
Japanese male video game actors
Japanese male voice actors
People from Kesennuma, Miyagi
20th-century Japanese male actors
21st-century Japanese male actors
Arts Vision voice actors